The Pennefather River is a river located on the western Cape York Peninsula in Far North Queensland, Australia.

Location and features
The river descends  over its  course.

Etymology and history
Yupanguthi  (Yuputhimri, Jupangati, Yupangathi, Nggerikudi, Yupungati, Jupangati) is an Australian Aboriginal language spoken on Yupanguthi country. The Yupanguthi language region includes the landscape within the local government boundaries of the landscape within the local government boundaries of the Shire of Cook.

The river mouth was a site of the first recorded landfall in Australia by a Dutch explorer, by Willem Janszoon in 1606. Janszoon named it R. met het Bosch ("River with the Forest").

In 1802 the British explorer Matthew Flinders mistook the river for the Coen River, which had been named by Dutch explorer Jan Carstensz in 1623 (now the Archer River), so that the Bosch / Pennefather River was named Coen River on maps in the 19th century. In 1880, Captain Charles Edward de Fonblanque Pennefather established that there were now two Coen Rivers, and in 1894 Queensland authorities named the river after him, although the British Admiralty Chart for the Gulf of Carpentaria kept the name Coen River until 1967.

See also

References

External links

Rivers of Far North Queensland